Georgi Kiknadze (born 26 April 1976) is a Georgian former football player and coach. He played  as a midfielder for FC Dinamo Tbilisi, FC Torpedo Kutaisi, Samsunspor, SC Freiburg, Lokomotivi Tbilisi, Spartaki Tbilisi and the Georgian national team. As part of the Dinamo Tbilisi team he won the Umaglesi Liga five times running from 1994 to 1998, and the Georgian Cup four years running from 1994 to 1997. He was also a runner-up in the Georgian Cup in 1998.

Career
Kiknadze joined Turkish club Samsunspor in October 1999, but stayed only one season, making just four appearances before moving to SC Freiburg in Germany. He failed to make the first team in his two seasons in Germany, and in 2003 he was released by Freiburg. He then returned to Georgia, where he played for Lokomotivi Tbilisi and later Spartaki Tbilisi.

He made his international debut on 5 December 1996 in a friendly match against Lebanon. Kiknadze captained the side in a 4–2 defeat, scoring Georgia's second goal. He obtained the last of his ten international caps on 28 April 1999, coming on as a substitute in a 4–1 loss against Norway.

Kiknadze started the 2006–07 season as coach of Olimpi Rustavi, entering coaching at the relatively young age of 30. This was Olimpi Rustavi's first season of existence; the club formed in 2006 following a merger between FC Tbilisi and FC Rustavi. At the start of the season Kiknadze led the club to a run of eight matches without conceding a single goal. However, midway through the season, with Olimpi leading the league, Kiknadze left the club after failing to agree terms on a new contract. Olimpi continued the good form they had enjoyed under Kiknadze, and won the league title. Kiknadze subsequently became coach at Torpedo Kutaisi, but just stayed in the job just one month. He became the coach of Lokomotivi Tbilisi on 7 April 2007.

Kiknadze's nephew Levan Kenia is also a professional footballer, playing for Czech club Slavia Prague.

References

1976 births
Living people
Footballers from Tbilisi
Association football midfielders
Footballers from Georgia (country)
Georgia (country) international footballers
Süper Lig players
Samsunspor footballers
SC Freiburg players
FC Dinamo Tbilisi players
Expatriate footballers from Georgia (country)
Expatriate sportspeople from Georgia (country) in Germany
Expatriate footballers in Germany
Expatriate sportspeople from Georgia (country) in Turkey
Expatriate footballers in Turkey